Sinfire Cinnamon Whisky is a brand made with blended Canadian whisky and all natural cinnamon flavors. It is imported, bottled, and distributed exclusively by Hood River Distillers, located in Hood River, Oregon, United States. Launched in February 2012, the whisky has a flavor reminiscent of Red Hots candy. The 70 proof spirit is available in 1.75 L, 1.0 L, 750 mL, 375 mL and 50 mL sizes.

Label

The product has a thermochromic temperature-sensitive label, which turns the icicles on the back blue when the bottle is chilled. This is intended to inform consumers when the bottle is at the optimal serving temperature of 32 degrees Fahrenheit.

In September 2015, Sinfire released a Limited Edition Northwest Label that featured a lime green and blue label. In August 2016, Sinfire released a green and yellow Limited Edition label.

Recognition
 Silver Medal—2013 Los Angeles International Wine & Spirits Competition
 Silver Medal—2013 Canadian Whisky Awards
 86 points—2012 Wine Enthusiast
 Triple Gold Medal—2012 MicroLiquor Spirit Awards
 Bronze Medal in the flavored whiskey division—San Francisco World Spirits Competition
 84 on a 100-point scale in the Canadian whisky category—2012 Ultimate Spirits Challenge
 Best of Class Medal and Platinum Medal in flavored whisky category—2012 Spirits International Prestige (SIP) Awards

See also
 Alcoholic beverages in Oregon
 List of Cocktails

References

External links
 Sinfire Whisky (official Website)

Canadian whisky
Products introduced in 2012